Rothesay in Buteshire was a royal burgh that returned one commissioner to the Parliament of Scotland and to the Convention of Estates.

After the Acts of Union 1707, Rothesay, Ayr, Campbeltown, Inveraray, and Irvine formed the Ayr district of burghs, returning one member between them to the House of Commons of Great Britain.

List of burgh commissioners

 1661: Adam Stewart 
1665 convention, 1667 convention: no representation
 1669–74: John Stewart of Askoge, advocate  
 1678 convention: Robert Stuart 
 1681–82, 1685–86: Cuthbert Stuart, provost 
 1689 convention, 1689–93: Robert Stewart of Tillicoultry, advocate 
 1693–1701: Robert Stewart, writer in Edinburgh 
 1702–07: Dougald Stewart of Blairhall

See also
 List of constituencies in the Parliament of Scotland at the time of the Union

References

Constituencies of the Parliament of Scotland (to 1707)
Constituencies disestablished in 1707
1707 disestablishments in Scotland
Politics of the county of Bute